"Swing" is a 2012 song by Slovak hip hop band AMO. While the original version of the composition was released on the group's studio album Positive (2011), its single version with featuring a vocal contribution by Celeste Buckingham, sung in English, was issued on June 5, 2012.

The single peaked at number five on the component Rádio SK 50 Oficiálna and at number forty-six on the Rádio Top 100 Oficiálna, respectively. The accompanying music video directed Martin Hudák.

Credits and personnel
 Opak - lead vocalist, writer, producer
 Moe - writer
 Celeste Buckingham - backing vocalist, writer
 Marcel Vén - producer

Track listings
 "Swing" (Album version) — 3:42
 "Swing" (Single version) featuring Celeste Buckingham — 3:42

Charts

References

External links
 AMO24hodin.sk > Media
 CelesteBuckingham.com > Music

2011 songs
2012 singles
Celeste Buckingham songs
Songs written by Celeste Buckingham